Leptoropha is an extinct genus of aquatic seymouriamorph known from the Middle Permian of Russia.

References

Permian tetrapods of Asia
Seymouriamorphs